Tony Tan (Tony Tan Keng Yam,born 1940) is a Singaporean politician, the seventh President of Singapore.

Tony Tan may also refer to:
 Tony Tan Caktiong, Filipino entrepreneur, founder of Jollibee
 Tony Tan Lay Thiam, opposition politician in Singapore 
 Tony Tan Poh Chuan, Singaporean murder victim in an unsolved double murder case that occurred in Sydney